Obernburg is a hamlet in Sullivan County, New York, United States. Obernburg has a post office with ZIP code 12767, which opened on September 14, 1885.

References

Hamlets in Sullivan County, New York
Hamlets in New York (state)